Darius Mead (July 9, 1787– January 28, 1864) was a member of the Connecticut Senate representing the 12th District from 1844 to 1846.

Mead was the son of Joshua and Rachel (Knapp) Mead, of Round Hill, Greenwich, Conn., was born in that town, July 9, 1787. He was fitted for College under the tuition of Rev. I. Lewis, D.D.  he graduated from Yale College in 1807.

After pursuing a course of study under Dr. Benjamin Rush, in Philadelphia, he received a medical diploma in 1809. He practiced medicine for a few months in New York City, but returned to his native town in 1810 and there continued to reside, still engaged in practice.

In 1845 and 1846, he represented the 12th Senatorial District in the Senate of Connecticut, being nominated without his knowledge of the intentions of his fellow-citizens. For one year he was a member of the Corporation of Yale College.

His death occurred in Greenwich, January 28, 1864. A funeral sermon, by Rev S. B. S. Bissell, of Norwalk, Connecticut was published. (N. Y, 1864, 8vo. 19 pp )

Dr. Mead was married in 1809, to Lydia K, daughter of Elisha Belcher, M. D, of Round Hill, who died in 1848.

References

External links

Connecticut state senators
People from Greenwich, Connecticut
Yale College alumni
1787 births
1864 deaths
Physicians from Connecticut
19th-century American politicians